Sikringsstyrelsen, later Den Sociale Sikringsstyrelse, was a Danish  in the Velfærdsministeriet, which was absorbed into the  in 2009.

The directorate worked to secure citizens' social rights, including in the form of international pension and social security, across national borders. It intervened in individual cases. At the same time, the directorate oversaw individual citizens' compliance with rules in the directorate's area.

In 1992, the Sikringsstyrelsen was founded, and lasted until November 2007, when it was absorbed into the now defunct Socialministeriet. In 2007, the directorate employed 141 full-time staff equivalents.

Government agencies of Denmark
1992 establishments in Denmark
2007 disestablishments in Denmark